Water Works Park may refer to:

 Water Works Park in Detroit, Michigan
 Water Works Park (Tampa, Florida)
 Water Works Park (Des Moines), an approximately 1,500 acre park near downtown Des Moines (one of the largest urban parks)
 Water Works Park (Minneapolis)
 WaterWorks Park, an amusement park in Redding, California